Krasnogorsk is a city and the administrative center of Krasnogorsky District in Moscow Oblast, Russia, located on the Moskva River, adjacent to the northwestern boundary of Moscow. Population:

History
An urban-type settlement was established here in 1932, to which town status was granted in 1940.

In the 1940s, the Antifascist Central School, in which many foreign Communists studied and lectured, was located at Krasnogorsk.

After the war, the German V2 rocket scientists which the Soviet Army had captured were settled here with their families.

Administrative and municipal status
Within the framework of administrative divisions, Krasnogorsk serves as the administrative center of Krasnogorsky District. As an administrative division, it is, together with two rural localities, incorporated within Krasnogorsky District as the Town of Krasnogorsk. As a municipal division, the Town of Krasnogorsk is incorporated within Krasnogorsky Municipal District as Krasnogorsk Urban Settlement.

Economy
The city is known for the Krasnogorsky Zavod company, which produced the Zorki, Zenit, and Krasnogorsk cameras there until the early 1990s. The coat of arms acknowledges this by featuring a prism and light rays.

Krasnogorsk is one of the few oblast cities that is connected to Moscow via Moscow Metro. It is served by Metro station Myakinino (named after a nearby village).

Crocus Expo, Russia's largest exhibition center, is located in Krasnogorsk.

Education and culture
Education is represented by 18 government and 4 private schools.

In addition, the city has a music school, art school, a center for the development of creativity for children and youth, a sports school for basketball.

In Krasnogorsk there is The Moscow Region Palace of Culture, the Scarlet Sails Concert Hall with an organ function (the Krasnogorsk Philharmonic Society operates on the basis of the hall).

Krasnogorsk has the only museum of German anti-fascists in the country. Near Krasnogorsk, there is a private museum of vintage cars and technology.

Sports
The city is home to Zorky Krasnogorsk bandy team, who are former national champions for men (three titles, one each for Soviet Union, Commonwealth of Independent States (the only season that title was played for) and Russia). After getting in financial problems, the team did not play in the 2016–17 Russian Bandy Super League, but will return to the highest division for the 2017–18 season. The club has also become national champions for women. Their home arena, Zorky Stadium, has a capacity of 8,000. 7th-9 December 2017, it will host a four nations tournament.

Notable people
Krasnogorsk is the birthplace of Russian hockey player Vladimir Petrov.

American MMA fighter Jeff Monson was elected to the local council in 2018.

Twin towns – sister cities

Krasnogorsk is twinned with:

 Antibes, France
 Goirle, Netherlands
 Höchstadt an der Aisch, Germany
 Karelichy, Belarus
 Plungė, Lithuania
 Slivnitsa, Bulgaria
 Tukums, Latvia
 Wągrowiec, Poland

References

Notes

Sources

External links

Official website of Krasnogorsk 
Official website of Zorky, a bandy club based in Krasnogorsk 

Cities and towns in Moscow Oblast
Cities and towns built in the Soviet Union
Populated places established in 1932
Krasnogorsky District, Moscow Oblast
1932 establishments in Russia